Pozhuthana  is a village in Wayanad district in the state of Kerala, India.

Physiography, relief and drainage
The panchayat comes under the highland region of Wayanad district and consists of many undulating hills intersected by valleys. In general, the area is having hilly to undulating topography with flat-bottomed valleys. Relief of the area is subnormal to normal.

Demographics
 India census, Pozhuthana had a population of 7643 with 3747 males and 3896 females.

Geographic location

Pozhuthana panchayat in Vythiri taluk of Wayanad district is located about 8 km west of Kalpetta town. It is bounded on the north by Thariode panchayats, south by vythiri taluk panchayat, east by Kalpetta municipality and west by Kozhikode District. It lies between 11°31’57" and 11°37’53" north latitude and 75°56’38" and 76°03’21" east longitude.

The panchayat is mostly drained by Pozhuthana river and the streamlets draining into it. Pozhuthana River flows through the middle of the panchayat from south to north and finally drains into Kabani River. The panchayat area is moderately well drained to well drained and exhibits a dendritic drainage pattern. Depth of ground water fluctuates considerably with physiography, but generally remains between a depth of 5–20 m in the elevated areas and 1–5 m in the valleys.

Demographics
 India census, Achooranam had a population of 9754 with 4755 males and 4999 females.

Transportation
Puzhuthana is 74 km by road from Kozhikode railway station and this road includes nine hairpin bends. The nearest major airport is at Calicut. The road to the east connects to Mysore and Bangalore. Night journey is allowed on this sector as it goes through Bandipur national forest. The nearest railway station is Mysore.  There are airports at Bangalore and Calicut. Pozhuthana is 5 kilometers from Vythiri town.

References

Villages in Wayanad district
Kalpetta area